The Queensland Girls' Secondary Schools Sports Association Inc (QGSSSA) is a sporting association for girls from eight private girls' schools, one co-educational private school, and one co-educational public school, based in Brisbane, Queensland, Australia.
Established in 1908 as the Secondary Schools Sports Association, inter-school competition commenced in 1909 in the sports of Swimming, Tennis and Basket Ball. Competition is offered to, and organised for, girls from Years 7 to 12.

History

The Sports Association of Secondary Schools of Queensland, was formed in 1908, with three members: Brisbane Girls Grammar School, The Brisbane High School for Girls (now Somerville House) and Eton High School (now St Margaret's Anglican Girls School). There is some evidence to suggest that Moreton Bay College may also have participated in sporting competitions in the early years. The association had been initiated by Constance Harker, co-Principal of Somerville House, and its aim was to "promote a friendly spirit between schools and at the same time deepen and strengthen the loyalty of individual girls to their own school".

Ipswich Girls' Grammar School and St Hilda's School joined the Association in 1911, followed by the Brisbane State High School in 1921, St Aidan's Anglican Girls' School in 1939, Clayfield College in 1941, Moreton Bay College in 1945, and St Peters Lutheran College in 1946. Several other schools have also been members of the QGSSSA at some time, – Girton College Toowoomba, Commercial State High School, University High School, Wynnum High School and Technical College.

Schools

Members 

  
(N.B. Years of participation in the QGSSSA in brackets.)
 Girton College, Toowoomba (1908)
 Commercial State High School
 University High School
 Wynnum High School and Technical College

Sports Played 
 Badminton
 Basketball
 Cricket
 Cross Country
 Gymnastics (Artistic)
 Gymnastics (Rhythmic) 
 Hockey
 Netball
 Football
 Softball
 Tennis 
 Touch Football
 Track & Field Athletics
 Volleyball
 Swimming

Head of the Schoolgirls Regatta

Swimming

References

See also
List of schools in Queensland
Head of the River (Queensland)

Australian school sports associations
Sports governing bodies in Queensland
Sports organizations established in 1908
1908 establishments in Australia